Thomas William O'Brien (February 16, 1916 – November 17, 1955) was an American professional basketball player. He played for the Akron Firestone Non-Skids in the National Basketball League for two seasons and averaged 1.9 points per game.

O'Brien died on November 17, 1955 due to nephrosclerosis.

References

1916 births
1955 deaths
Akron Firestone Non-Skids players
American Basketball League (1925–1955) players
American men's basketball players
Basketball players from New Jersey
Basketball players from New York (state)
Forwards (basketball)
George Washington Colonials men's basketball players
Guards (basketball)
Union Hill High School alumni